The Telemann Prize is an annual classical music award for special achievements in interpretation, research and cultivation of the life and work of Georg Philipp Telemann.

Since 1987, the city of Magdeburg has awarded the prize every year in March at the time of Telemann's birthday (14 March). Prize winners can be artists, scientists, music teachers, ensembles, institutions or laymen.

The prize consists of a bronze plaque designed by the Berlin sculptor  and is endowed with 2,500 euros.

Recipients 
 
 1987: Walther Siegmund-Schultze – musicologist
 1988: Ludwig Güttler – trumpeter
 1989:  – musicologist and music educator
 1990: Burkhard Glaetzner – oboist
 1991: Günter Fleischhauer – musicologist
 1992: Erich Valentin – musicologist
 1993: Werner Menke – musicologist
 1994: Peter Schreier – singer and conductor
 1995: Martin Ruhnke – musicologist
 1996: Cappella Coloniensis – orchestra
 1997: Vladimir Ossipowitsch Rabey – musicologist and music educator
 1998: Hermann Max – church musician
 1999:  – musicologist
 2000: Michael Schneider – conductor and flutist
 2001: Muzeum Zamkowe w Pszczynie (State Castle Museum in Pszczyna)
 2002: Reinhard Goebel – violinist and conductor
 2003:  – musicologist
 2004: Nikolaus Harnoncourt – conductor, cellist and music writer
 2005:  – musicologist
 2006: Akademie für Alte Musik Berlin – orchestra
 2007: Bärenreiter-Verlag – music publisher
 2008: René Jacobs – conductor and countertenor
 2009: Carus-Verlag – music publisher
 2010: Simon Standage – violinist and conductor
 2011: Working group "Georg Philipp Telemann" Magdeburg – organiser of the Magdeburger Telemann-Festtage
 2012: Siegfried Pank – cellist, viol player and musicologist
 2013: Helmut Winschermann – oboist and conductor
 2014: Paul Dombrecht – oboist and conductor
 2015:  – music publisher
 2016: Klaus Mertens – bass-baritone
 2017: Burkhard Schmilgun – producer and director of the Classic Produktion Osnabrück – music label
 2018: Gotthold Schwarz – Thomaskantor and bass-baritone
 2019: Klaus Hofmann – musicologist
 2020: Dorothee Oberlinger – recorder player and conductor
 2021: Elizabeth Wallfisch – violinist
 2022:  – musicologist and performer
 2023: Ian Payne – musicologist

References

External links 
 Georg-Philipp-Telemann-Preis
 

German music awards
Magdeburg
Awards established in 1987
Georg Philipp Telemann